Sir Geoffrey Newland Roberts  (8 December 1906 – 27 August 1995) was a New Zealand military aviator and leader, and airline manager. He was born in Inglewood, Taranaki, New Zealand in 1906.

Roberts was awarded the Air Force Cross in the 1941 King's Birthday Honours. In 1946 he was appointed a Commander of the Order of the British Empire in recognition of his service in operations against the Japanese. He was appointed a Knight Bachelor, for services to aviation, in the 1973 New Year Honours.

In 2001, Roberts was posthumously inducted into the New Zealand Business Hall of Fame.

References

1906 births
1995 deaths
People from Inglewood, New Zealand
New Zealand military personnel
New Zealand aviators
New Zealand recipients of the Air Force Cross (United Kingdom)
New Zealand Commanders of the Order of the British Empire
New Zealand Knights Bachelor